A Decade of Destruction is the first compilation album by American heavy metal band Five Finger Death Punch. It was released on December 1, 2017, by Prospect Park. On October 27, 2017, the band issued "Trouble", the first of two new songs included on the album.

Background
On October 27, 2017, the website Metal Injection reported that the band's drummer and author Jeremy Spencer had stated to Razor 94.7: "It just seems like it just started even though it's been 10 years. We're always wrapped up in our vacuum in our cocoon of our daily life. So you don't pay attention to that stuff and now we're like 'we have a greatest hits.' And the label thought it was the right time. So we were like 'Cool, let's put some new songs on it though.' We don't wanna make... cause people can pretty much... ya know they have the records already. But now this is a cool package with different stuff on it. The artwork's really rad on it. It's cool."

Track listing

Personnel
 Ivan Moody – vocals
 Zoltan Bathory – rhythm guitars
 Jeremy Spencer – drums, percussion
 Jason Hook – lead guitars, backing vocals (tracks 1–9, 11–16)
 Chris Kael – bass, backing vocals (tracks 1–4, 6–9, 11–15)
 Matt Snell – bass, backing vocals (tracks 5, 10, 16)
 Darrell Roberts – guitars on "The Bleeding"
 Uros Raskovski – guitar solo on "The Bleeding"

Charts

Weekly charts

Year-end charts

Singles

Certifications

References

2017 compilation albums
Five Finger Death Punch albums